Naga station is a railway station located on the South Main Line in Naga, Camarines Sur, Philippines. It is a major station on the line, serving as the main terminus for the Bicol Commuter, Bicol Express train services and the end station for the Isarog Limited Express. The station is considered the largest of all Philippine National Railways (PNR) stations in Southern Luzon. It houses the regional offices of PNR that covers the total jurisdiction over Southern Luzon.

History

Naga was opened on April 1, 1920, as one of the stations along the Legazpi Division line of the Manila Railroad Company. By 1938, the Legazpi Division was merged into the Main Line South. During the PNR era, Naga became the terminus of the Peñafrancia Express that was inaugurated in 1981. The service ended in 2004. Meanwhile, the present building was rebuilt in the late 2000s and was opened in 2009 for the Isarog Limited. The service became irregular by 2012 until the line was once again closed in 2014.

The Bicol Commuter, a commuter rail/local train service, was once again inaugurated in the mid-2010s. Naga is currently the southern terminus of the service.

Future
A new Naga station will be built outside of the city center under the PNR South Long Haul project. This is to avoid congestion in the city, loosen its track curvature, and to allow for expansion of the station. The last one includes additional station tracks, a freight depot and a light-duty maintenance facility.

References

Philippine National Railways stations
Railway stations in Camarines Sur
Buildings and structures in Naga, Camarines Sur